Grow Up is the third self-produced solo album by Svoy. It was released in Japan on June 22, 2011, on Thistime Records. U.S./International release followed on June 28, 2011, on Sixteenth Republic Records. In July 2011, it was announced that the album's opening track "Never Grow Up" was picked up for power rotation by Japan's FM Ishikawa 80.5 MHz with the song debuting at #95 on the station's HOT 100 Chart and subsequently peaking at #63. In the same month, it was announced that another track from the album, "Right Here, Right Now", was picked up for Hyper Power Play by Japan's FM Kento 76.5 MHz, with an exclusive feature of "Grow Up" album cover artwork on FM Kento's internet home page. In November, 2011, Russian version of "Never Grow Up" entitled "Navsegda" was added by Moscow's major radio network 94.8 MHz RU.FM and remained in steady rotation until July 2013. Following its release, the album received international critical acclaim: New York's TheCelebrityCafe.com described the album as "...A sonic adventure. Swooning. Emotive."; Tokyo's Skream! Magazine called it "...Superb. Sophisticated. Beautiful."; Tokyo's Bounce Magazine described it as "...Wispy. Poetic."; Osaka's Flake Records Magazine noted that the album is "...Beautiful. Exhilarating." and Niigata's 76.5 FM Kento gave the album "...High praise.".

Track listing

Personnel
Svoy – keyboards, keytar, vocals, spoken word, producer, programming, arrangement, sound engineering, mixing, mastering, photography, art direction, design
Kevin Reagan – Svoy logo design

Release history

References

2011 albums
Svoy albums